Horace Edward Dobbs (born 14 January 1933, in London), and commonly referred to as Horace Dobbs  is a British scientist, researcher, author, and television producer, who is regarded as an expert on dolphins and their behaviour. In 1978, Dobbs sets up the International Dolphin Watch. He also founded the Oxford Underwater Research Group.

Early life
Born in London, Dobbs attended the John Ruskin School and graduated at the age of 16. After high school, Dobbs worked briefly as a laboratory assistant in the Burroughs Wellcome Research Laboratories Beckenham, Kent. At the age of 20, Dobbs married his wife Wendy, and at 23, he graduated from London University with a BSc honours degree in Chemistry via part-time studies.

From the Burroughs Wellcome laboratories, Horace Dobbs moved over to the Atomic Energy Authority (UKAEA), where he wrote two research publications, Quenching and Adsorption in Liquid scintillation counting, in 1962, and Dispensing solutions for liquid scintillation counting, published in the scientific and technical Aerospace reports, Volume 3, issue 17 in April 1965. While at UKAEA, Dobbs obtained his PhD from Oxford University. During this time, he developed his passion for diving and also wrote his first book, Camera Underwater.

Dolphin career
Dobbs started chronicling his studies and dolphin interactions with the airing of Neptune's Needle on the BBC One, on 24 June 1965 and 20 March 1966. A New York Times article on a dolphin named Fungie reported that Dr. Dobbs spent two years filming the dolphin.

Dobbs is considered an expert in subjects relating to dolphin behaviour, and in the Folkestone trial of two men accused of bothering a dolphin, Dobbs was called in as a defense witness. He was also interviewed by the BBC Radio Cornwall regarding the whereabouts and safety of a dolphin named Beaky of which he had written a book on titled, Follow a Wild Dolphin.

As a wildlife conservationist, Dobbs has argued against keeping dolphins in captivity. In an article by the BBC, Dobbs was quoted as saying that keeping dolphins in captivity at resorts or aquatic parks is akin to torture.

As more and more people interact with dolphins, a growing number of experts, Dobbs included, believe that swimming with dolphins have a therapeutic effect on those suffering from depression. A 1994 essay by Hon. David Lloyd Hoare narrated the story of how Dr. Dobbs took some persons to swim with a dolphin named Simo, and the therapeutic effect it had on one of them.

Latter years

In his latter years, Dobbs moved away from factual writing and film-making to creating a series of fictional children's book about an orphaned Dolphin called Dilo. Although these books are fictional, the stories are all based on actual events that Dobbs had experienced with wild dolphins.

Dobbs lives in North Ferriby in the East Riding of Yorkshire, England, near the city of Hull. He is married to Wendy Dobbs (now in a care home).  Dobbs has two children Melanie Parker and Ashley Dobbs, five grandchildren, and five great-grandchildren.

Filmography
 Horace Dobbs on BFI.
 Dobbs Goosen Films at BFI.

Discography
 Horace E. Dobbs.
 Soundtrack to Wonders of the underwater world Dobbs Goosen Films.

Award
 INTERNATIONAL-PLATFORM-ASSOCIATION-AWARDS.

Scientific papers
 The Radioisotopes, from Nuclear Science Abstracts, Volume 18, Issues 1–7.
 Dispensing solutions for liquid scintillation counting. Published in NASA's scientific and technical Aerospace reports, Volume 3, issue 17. April 1965.
 Quenching and Adsorption in Liquid scintillation counting, August 1962.
 The detection of tritium labelled compounds in Vapour phase chromatography. Journal of Chromatography A, Volume 5, 1961.

Horace Dobbs' books
List of books by Dr. Horace E. Dobbs.
 The Great Diving Adventure, (J.H. Haynes & Co. Limited).
 Underwater Swimming, (Collins Nutshell Books).
 Camera Underwater, (Focal Press).
 Follow a Wild Dolphin, (Souvenir Press).
 Save the Dolphins, with a foreword by HRH Prince Philip (Souvenir Press).
 The Magic of Dolphins, (Lutterworth Press).
 Tale of Two Dolphins, (Jonathan Cape).
 Dance to a Dolphins Song, (Jonathan Cape).
 Snorkelling and Skin Diving, with a foreword by HRH Prince Charles (Oxford illustrated Press)
 Classic Dives of the World, (Oxford illustrated Press).
 Journey into Dolphin Dreamtime, (Jonathan Cape).
 Dilo and the Call of the Deep, (Watch Publishing).
 Dilo Makes Friends, (Watch Publishing).
 Dolphin Healing, (Piatkus Books).
 Dilo and the Treasure Hunters, (Watch Publishing).
 Dilo in Lighthouse Bay, (Watch Publishing).
 Dilo and the Isle of the Gods, (Star Books).
 Dilo and the Mystery of Atlantis (awaiting publication)

Notes

References

External links
 Horace Dobbs Website
 International Dolphin Watch

1933 births
Living people